Tibet Autonomous Regional People's Government is the provincial administrative agency of Tibet, People 's Republic of China. The provincial government consists of the Tibet Autonomous Regional People's Congress, the TAR People's Congress Standing Committee, and has a mandate to frame local laws and regulations, such as the use of the Tibetan language in the region. Additionally, rules for adapting national laws to the province are also the responsibility of the People's Government.

Political leaders 

Political leaders of Tibet include:

 Secretary of the Chinese Communist Party Tibet Autonomous Region Committee
 Chairmen of the Standing Committee of the Tibet Autonomous Region People's Congress
 Chairmen of the Chinese People's Political Consultative Conference Tibet Autonomous Region Committee

Departments and institutions 
Departments under the TAR government cover education, science and technology, economy and information technology, ethnic affairs, public security, civil affairs, justice, finance, human resources and social security, housing and urban-rural development, transportation, water resources, commerce, culture, tourism, veteran affairs, water, health.

References

Further reading 

 China’s White Paper On Tibetan Autonomy Successful Practice Of Regional Ethnic Autonomy. A Compilation Of A Series Of “Expert On Tibet” Programs On Radio Free Asia Tibetan Service By Warren W. Smith.
 Manoj Joshi (June 2021). China's 2021 White Paper on Tibet. ORF.

Tibet Autonomous Region
1965 establishments in China